Josip Frank (16 April 1844 – 17 December 1911) was a Croatian lawyer and politician, a noted representative of the Party of Rights in the Croatian Parliament, and a vocal advocate of Croatian national independence in Austria-Hungary.

Early life 

Frank was born into a Croatian-Jewish family, but converted to Catholicism at the age of 18 and attended the gymnasium in Osijek. After having finished his law studies at the Vienna University in 1868, he moved to Zagreb in 1872 and worked as an attorney at law.

Political career 

Frank's initial political involvement included a critique of the People's Party (of Josip Juraj Strossmayer), joining the opinion of ban Levin Rauch. When Ivan Mažuranić became Croatian ban in 1873, Frank criticized him because of his relations with the Magyars and the Serbs.

In 1877, he founded the newspapers Agramer Presse and Kroatische Post, which were soon banned by the Austro-Hungarian authorities.

In 1880, Frank published a brochure titled Die Quote Kroatiens, in which he tried to prove that Croatia bore a disproportionately high financial burden since the 1868 Nagodba (Compromise), a legal arrangement that regulated the constitutional position of Croatia within the Austro-Hungarian Empire. In 1880, Frank was elected to the Zagreb City council, where he would serve until 1894.

In 1880, the Croatian poet August Šenoa characterised Frank in the following manner: "The infamous Zagreb attorney ... degrades and befouls all that is Croatian, first to the benefit of the Magyars, now of the Austrians ... Frank is a political louse, who served Rauch, then the Swabian Generalkommando ... he offered himself to the Orthodox voter in Pakrac, bragging about ... protecting Serbian interests."

In 1884, Frank was elected as an independent delegate to the Croatian Sabor, representing the Kotar of Popovača. In 1887, he was elected to represent the Kotar of Vojni Križ.

In 1890, supported by Fran Folnegović, he joined Ante Starčević's Croatian Party of Rights, soon advancing to the highest ranks of the party. Frank became instrumental in the writing of the political programme of the Party of Rights, published on June 6, 1894. In 1895, after an incident in which students from Zagreb publicly burned the Hungarian flag in front of Emperor Franz Joseph, a rift formed in the party as Folnegović and others condemned that act. Shortly afterwards, and shortly before Starčević died, Frank persuaded Starčević to split off his fraction to form the Pure Party of Rights with its mouthpiece Hrvatsko pravo. By 1897, Frank had become the true leader of the Croatian states' rights movement, advancing to president of the party after Starčević's death. Frank's Party of Rights was opposed to the Party of Rights led by Frano Supilo and other advocates of the policy of a "New Course", of alignment towards Serbs.

Frank maintained an interest in financial matters, which earned him a regular place in the Croatian Parliament's finance committee, and later in the budget committee. He was a member of the board of financial matters of the Kingdom of Croatia between 1898 and 1906. In 1898, he published a treatise called Nuncij where he harshly accused Hungary for a perceived injustice in the financial terms of the settlement between Croatia and Hungary. In 1904 Frank reiterated his demands for a financial independence of Croatia, and in part due to his efforts, in 1906 a new financial agreement between Croatia and Hungary was formed which was considered the most beneficial to the Croatian side.

One of the most important characteristics of the Frank's followers was their anti-Serb position. After Peter I Karađorđević came to power in Serbia in 1903, Frank's attention increasingly turned to opposing any rapprochement with the Serbs, unlike the majority opinion represented by the Croato-Serbian Coalition. In the 1906 election the Party of Rights became the main opposition to the Coalition, and quite a staunch one at that, collaborating with ban Pavao Rauch (1908-1910), who represented the interests of Austria and Hungary, to depose the Coalition because of its "Yugoslav" programme. During the Bosnian annexation crisis in 1908, he was the initiator of a persecution of Serbs accused for high treason. Frank also played a role in the infamous Friedjung trial of 1909 where it would be proved that the Austrian historian Heinrich Friedjung reproduced libellous claims of treason against the leaders of the Croato-Serbian Coalition. Josip Frank carried on Starčević's ideology, and defined Croat identity 'strictly in terms of Serbophobia'. He opposed any cooperation between Croats and Serbs, and the historian Aleksa Djilas described him as "a leading anti-Serbian demagogue and the instigator of the persecution of Serbs in Croatia". His followers, called Frankovci, were the most ardent Ustashe members.

Politically, Frank appeared as a radical nationalist, who apparently lent himself to the political ideas of a "Greater Croatia" and a trialistic approach to the Habsburg lands by making the Kingdom of Croatia the third entity in the empire. Unlike  Ante Starčević, that was anticlerical, Frank considered to be useful collaboration with Catholic church in Croatia. In the later stages of his career, he appeared as a man of confidence to the Viennese authorities, often acting secretly on their behalf.

Josip Frank's support for the Austrian court in his fight against the pro-Yugoslav and pro-Serbian forces did not go unopposed within his own party, as in 1908 Mile Starčević led a faction (called Milinovci) to form a splinter Starčević Party of Rights. In 1909 Frank fell terminally ill, and could no longer take active part in politics. After that, the party attracted a prominent group of Catholic intellectuals to join them in 1910 and changed their name to Christian-Social Party of Rights. In 1911, they reconciled with the Starčević Party of Rights, and merged back into a single Party of Rights. Frank lived to witness this, but died shortly thereafter. Frank was buried at the Mirogoj Cemetery.

His daughter Olga was Slavko Kvaternik's wife.

References

Bibliography

 
 

1844 births
1911 deaths
People from Osijek
Representatives in the Croatian Parliament (1848–1918)
Croatian Jews
Austro-Hungarian Jews
Croatian Austro-Hungarians
Party of Rights politicians
Converts to Roman Catholicism from Judaism
Burials at Mirogoj Cemetery
Croatian nationalists
Croatian Roman Catholics
Catholicism and far-right politics